Texas Red is a red fluorescent dye.

Texas Red may also refer to:

The 1976 LP by Red Steagall, or the title song
Texas Red (horse) (born 2012), American Thoroughbred racehorse
Red Bastien (1931–2012), professional wrestler who formerly used the ring name Texas Red
The Undertaker (born 1965), professional wrestler who formerly used the ring name Texas Red
Texas Red, a character in the country ballad Big Iron